Laura and L. D. Nelson were an African-American mother and son who were lynched on May 25, 1911, near Okemah, Okfuskee County, Oklahoma. They had been seized from their cells in the Okemah county jail the night before by a group of up to 40 white men, reportedly including Charley Guthrie, father of the folk singer Woody Guthrie. The Associated Press reported that Laura was raped. She and L. D. were then hanged from a bridge over the North Canadian River. According to one source, Laura had a baby with her who survived the attack.

Laura and L. D. were in jail because L. D. had been accused of having shot and killed Deputy Sheriff George H. Loney of the Okfuskee County Sherriff's Office, during a search of the Nelsons' farm for a stolen cow. L. D. and Laura were both charged with murder; Laura was charged because she allegedly grabbed the gun first. Her husband, Austin, pleaded guilty to larceny and was sent to the relative safety of the state prison in McAlester, while his wife and son were held in the county jail until their trial.

Sightseers gathered on the bridge on the morning of the lynching. George Henry Farnum, the owner of Okemah's only photography studio, took photographs, which were distributed as postcards, a common practice at the time. Although the district judge convened a grand jury, the killers were never identified. Four of Farnum's photographs are known to have survived—two spectator scenes and one close-up view each of L. D. and Laura. Three of the images were published in 2000 and exhibited at the Roth Horowitz Gallery in New York by James Allen, an antique collector. The images of Laura Nelson are the only known surviving photographs of a black female lynching victim.

Background

Lynching in the United States

Historian Amy Louise Wood writes about lynchings:

Lynching could involve victims being hanged furtively at night by a small group or during the day in front of hundreds or even thousands of witnesses; the latter is known as "spectacle lynchings". The whole community might attend; newspapers sometimes publicized them in advance, and special trains brought in more distant community members. An audience of 10,000, including the mayor and chief of police, was said to have attended the lynching of Jesse Washington in Waco, Texas, in 1916. As well as being hanged, victims were sometimes tortured first and burned alive; body parts were removed and kept or sold as souvenirs. Almost all perpetrators were white and the victims were black. The political message—the promotion of white supremacy and black powerlessness—was an important element of the ritual, so that even the quieter lynchings might be photographed and the images published as postcards.

According to the Tuskegee Institute, 4,745 people are recorded as having been lynched in the United States between 1882 and 1964; 3,446 (72.7 percent) of them were black. Lynching came to be associated with the Deep South; 73 percent of lynchings took place in the Southern United States. Between 1882 and 1903, 125 black-on-black lynchings were recorded in 10 southern states, as were four cases of whites being lynched by black people. There were 115 recorded cases of women lynched between 1851 and 1946; 90 were black, 19 white, and six Hispanic or uncertain. Women were usually lynched as associates of men who were being lynched; of 97 incidents examined by historian Kerry Segrave, 36 were of women lynched alone.

In Oklahoma

Oklahoma Territory was said in 1892 by the governor of Oklahoma to be "about 85 percent white, 10 percent colored and 5 percent Indians". It was awarded statehood in 1907, with laws that enshrined racial segregation (Jim Crow laws). In 1911 Okemah's school had 555 white students and one black student. There were 147 recorded lynchings in Oklahoma between 1885 and 1930. Until statehood in 1907, most victims were white cattle rustlers or highwaymen. In all, 77 victims were white, 50 black, 14 American Indians, five unknown, and one Chinese. Five women—two black, two white, and one other—were lynched in Oklahoma in four incidents between 1851 and 1946.

People

Nelson family

The Nelsons lived on a farm six miles north of Paden, Oklahoma, a largely White town. Austin Nelson was born in Waco, Texas, in 1873. According to historian Frances Jones-Sneed, his parents, Dave and Rhoda Nelson, had been born into slavery in Georgia; Dave Nelson worked as a molder in Waco.

Austin and Laura married in 1896; L. D. was born around the next year. (L. D. was regularly referred to after the lynching as L. W. or Lawrence.) In 1900 the extended family moved to Pottawatomie County, Oklahoma. According to Jones-Sneed, Laura and Austin were listed in the 1910 census as having two children, L. D., aged 13, and Carrie, aged two. It is not known what became of Carrie. She was probably the baby one witness said survived the lynching; several sources said she was found floating in the river.

George Loney
Around 35 years old when he died, Deputy Sheriff George H. Loney had lived in Paden for several years and was held in the highest regard, according to The Okemah Ledger. Described by the newspaper as a fearless man, he was known for having helped to stop the practice of bootlegging in Paden, on behalf of supporters of the local temperance movement. Later he became a state enforcement officer, then deputy sheriff. He was buried in Lincoln County near Paden on May 4, 1911. The Ledger wrote that every office in the courthouse closed for an hour during his funeral.

Death of Loney

Shooting

George Loney formed a posse consisting of himself, Constable Cliff Martin, Claude Littrell, and Oscar Lane, after a steer was stolen from Littrell's property in Paden on May 1. Littrell obtained a search warrant from A. W. Jenkins, a Justice of the Peace, which allowed the men to search the Nelson's farm. They arrived there on May 2 at around 9 pm, and read the warrant to Austin Nelson before entering the house. The steer's remains were found in either the barn or house.

When the men entered the Nelson's home, Loney asked Constable Martin to take the cap off a muzzle-loading shotgun that was hanging on the wall. The Independent reported that, as Martin reached for the gun, Laura Nelson said: "Look here, boss, that gun belongs to me!" Martin said he told her that he wanted only to unload the gun.

The Independent and Ledger offered different versions of events. According to the Independent, which was more sympathetic to the Nelsons, Laura grabbed another gun, a Winchester rifle hidden behind a trunk. L. D. took hold of the Winchester at the same time, and during the struggle for the gun, it went off. A bullet passed through Constable Martin's pant legs, grazing him in the thigh, then hit Loney in the hip and entered his abdomen. He walked outside and died a few minutes later.

According to the Ledger, L. D. had grabbed the Winchester, pumped a shell into it, and fired. Austin had then taken hold of the rifle and tried to shoot Littrell, the newspaper said. During the ensuing gunfight, Loney had taken shelter behind a wagon. No one realized he had been hit until he asked for water; according to the newspaper, Laura responded: "Let the white  [sic] die." Loney reportedly bled to death within minutes. The Ledger described his death as "one of the most cold-blooded murders that has occurred in Okfuskee county".

Arrests and charges

Austin was arrested by Constable Martin on the evening of the shooting; he arrived with Martin in Okemah at 4 am on Wednesday, May 3. The Okfuskee county jail was in Okemah, a predominantly white town. Laura and L. D., described by the Ledger as "about sixteen years old, rather yellow, ignorant and ragged", were arrested later that day. Sheriff Dunnegan found them at the home of the boy's uncle. According to The Independent, they made no effort to escape and were brought to the county jail on the night train.

Austin admitted the theft of the cow, saying he had had no food for his children. According to his undated charge sheet, witnesses for the state were Littrell, Martin, Lane, and Lawrence Payne. (Lawrence Payne was also the name of the jailer on duty the night the Nelsons were kidnapped from the jail.) Austin's account of what happened tallied with that of the posse, except that he said he was the one, not Laura, who had objected to the shotgun being removed from the wall. He said Laura had been trying to take the rifle away from her son when it was fired.

During a hearing on May 6 before Justice Lawrence, Austin was held on a bond of $1,500, which he was unable to pay. After pleading guilty to larceny, he was sentenced on May 12 to three years in Oklahoma State Penitentiary. On May 16 he was sent to the state prison in McAlester 59 miles (95 km) away, which according to the Ledger probably saved his life. On May 10, before the same judge, Laura and L. D. (named by the Ledger as Mary and L. W. Nelson) were charged with murder and held without bail in the Okemah county jail. The Nelsons hired Blakeley, Maxey & Miley, a law firm in Shawnee, to represent them. The Ledger reported on May 18, under the headline "Negro Female Prisoner Gets Unruly", that on May 13 Laura had been "bad" when the jailer, Lawrence Payne, brought her dinner. She had reportedly tried to grab his gun when he opened the cell door, and when that failed she tried to throw herself out of a window. Payne "choked the woman loose", according to the newspaper, and after a struggle returned her to her cell. The Ledger wrote on May 25 that during the incident she had "begged to be killed".

May 25, 1911

Kidnap
Laura and L. D. were due to be arraigned on May 25. Between 11:30 and midnight on May 24, a group of between a dozen and 40 men arrived at the jail. They entered it through the front door of the sheriff's office. Payne, the jailer, said he had left it unlocked to let in a detective from McAlester, who was looking for an escaped prisoner. He said the men had bound, gagged and blindfolded him at gunpoint, taken his keys, and cut the telephone line. He was unable to identify them.

The boy was "stifled and gagged", according to the Ledger, and went quietly; prisoners in adjoining cells reportedly heard nothing. The men went to the women's cells and removed Laura, described by the newspaper as "very small of stature, very black, about thirty-five years old, and vicious". According to a July 1911 report in The Crisis (the magazine of the National Association for the Advancement of Colored People), and a female witness who said she had seen the lynching or its aftermath, the men also took the baby.

The jailer said that, after struggling for two hours, he escaped and raised the alarm at Moon's restaurant across the road from the jail. Sheriff Dunnegan sent out a search party to no avail. According to the Ledger, a fence post suspended on two chairs across a window was found in the jury room just after the lynching, near the cell where Laura had been held. It was thought that the men had intended to hang her out the window but had been deterred by an electric light burning nearby.

Lynching

Laura and L. D. were taken to a bridge over the North Canadian River, six miles west and one mile south of Okemah; it was described as on the old Schoolton road and at Yarbrough's crossing. According to the Associated Press and The Crisis, Laura was raped. The Ledger reported that the men gagged her and L. D. with tow sacks and, using rope made of half-inch hemp tied in a hangman's knot and hanged them from the bridge. They were found in the morning hanging 20 ft below the middle span. A local resident, John Earnest, reported the discovery to the sheriff's office. The front page of The Okemah Ledger on May 25, 1911, said the lynching had been "executed with silent precision that makes it appear as a masterpiece of planning":

The woman's arms were swinging by her side, untied, while about twenty feet away swung the boy with his clothes partly torn off and his hands tided with a saddle string. The only marks on either body were that made by the ropes upon the necks. Gently swaying in the wind, the ghastly spectacle was discovered this morning by a negro boy taking his cow to water. Hundreds of people from Okemah and the western part of the county went to view the scene.

The bodies were cut down from the bridge at 11:00 on May 25 by order of the county commissioner, then taken to Okemah. The Nelsons' relatives did not claim the bodies, and they were buried by the county in the Greenleaf cemetery near Okemah. Quoting the Muskogee Scimitar, The Crisis wrote that Laura had had a baby with her: "Just think of it. A woman taken from her suckling babe, and a boy—a child only fourteen years old—dragged through the streets by a howling mob of fiendish devils, the most unnameable crime committed on the helpless woman and then she and her son executed by hanging." According to William Bittle and Gilbert Geis, writing in 1964, Laura had been caring for a baby in jail and had the child with her when she was taken from her cell. They quoted a local woman: "After they had hung them up, those men just walked off and left that baby lying there. One of my neighbors was there, and she picked the baby up and brought it to town, and we took care of it. It's all grown up now and lives here."

Photographs

The scene after the lynching was recorded in a series of photographs by George Henry Farnum, the owner of Okemah's only photography studio. There are four known extant images taken from a boat. Photographs nos. 2894 and 2898 are close-up shots of L. D. and Laura; nos. 2897 and 2899 show the bridge and spectators. In no. 2899, 35 men and six women are on the bridge, along with 17 children, from toddlers to mid-teens. The photographs are marked with the photographer's name: "COPYRIGHT—1911—G. H. FARNUM, OKEMAH, OKLA."

It was common practice to turn lynching photographs into postcards. In May 1908, in an effort to stop the practice, the federal government amended the United States Postal Laws and Regulations to prevent "matter of a character tending to incite arson, murder or assassination" from being sent through the mail. The cards continued to sell, although not openly, and were sent instead in envelopes. Woody Guthrie said he recalled seeing the cards of the Nelsons for sale in Okemah. James Allen bought the photo postcard of Laura Nelson, a 3 1/2 x 5 1/2 inch gelatin silver print, for $75 in a flea market. The back of the card says "unmailable".

Seth Archer wrote in the Southwest Review that lynching photographs were partly intended as a warning, in the Nelson's case to the neighboring all-black Boley—"look what we did here, Negroes beware"— but the practice of sending cards to family and friends outside the area underlined the ritualistic nature of the lynchings. Spectators appearing in lynching photographs showed no obvious shame at being connected to the events, even when they were clearly identifiable. Someone wrote on the back of one card, of the 1915 Will Stanley lynching in Temple, Texas: "This is the Barbecue we had last night My picture is to the left with a cross over it your son Joe."

Aftermath

The Independent wrote on May 25, 1911, that "[t]here is not a shadow of an excuse for the crime", and later called it a "terrible blot on Okfuskee County, a reproach that it will take years to remove". The Okemah Ledger took the view that "while the general sentiment is adverse to the method, it is generally thought that the negroes got what would have been due them under due process of law." One newspaper, the Morning Phoenix, apparently tried to blame the black community, writing that the Nelsons had been "mobbed by Negroes". African-Americans expressed outrage. One black journal lamented:

There were rumors that the nearby black town of Boley was organizing an attack on Okemah. Okemah's women and children were sent to spend the night in a nearby field, with the men standing guard on Main Street. Oswald Garrison Villard of the National Association for the Advancement of Colored People (NAACP), wrote in protest to Lee Cruce, governor of Oklahoma. Cruce assured Villard he would do everything he could to bring the Nelson's killers to justice. In a reply to Villard dated June 9, 1911, Cruce called the lynching an "outrage", but he defended the laws of Oklahoma as "adequate" and its juries "competent", and said the administration of justice in the state proceeded with little cause for criticism, "except in cases of extreme passion, which no law and no civilization can control". He added:

The NAACP argued that nothing would change while governors like Cruce sought to excuse lynching as the product of the "uncontrollable passion" of white people. District Judge John Caruthers convened a grand jury in June 1911 to investigate, telling them it was the duty of people "of a superior race and of greater intelligence to protect this weaker race from unjustifiable and lawless attacks", but no one would identify the lynchers.

Legacy

Photographs

James Allen, an Atlanta antique collector, spent years looking for postcards of lynchings for his Without Sanctuary: Lynching Photography in America (2000). "Hundreds of flea markets later," he wrote, "a trader pulled me aside and in conspiratorial tones offered to sell me a real photo postcard. It was Laura Nelson hanging from a bridge, caught so pitiful and tattered and beyond retrieving—like a paper kite sagged on a utility wire."

The book accompanied an exhibition of 60 lynching postcards from 1880 to 1960, Witness: Photographs of Lynchings from the Collection of James Allen, which opened at the Roth Horowitz Gallery in New York in January 2000. Allen argued that lynching photographers were more than passive spectators. They positioned and lit the corpses as if they were game birds, he wrote, and the postcards became an important part of the act, emphasizing its political nature.

Allen's publication of the images encountered a mixed reception. Julia Hotton, a black museum curator in New York, said that with older black people especially: "If they hear a white man with a Southern accent is collecting these photos, they get a little skittish." Jennie Lightweis-Gof was critical of the "profoundly aestheticized readings" of Laura's body, arguing that writers tried to garner empathy for the Nelsons by focusing on Laura's appearance, producing empathy qua eroticism. Allen, for example, referred to Laura's "indissoluble femininity". Leightweis-Gof offered this as an example of "the Gaze": "the sense that every function of the female body is sexualized and aestheticized". Wendy Wolters argued that whenever Laura Nelson is viewed as a "fetishized and feminized object", she is violated again.

Guthries

One of the lynchers may have been Charley Guthrie (died 1956), father of the folk singer Woody Guthrie, who was born in Okemah in 1912, 14 months after the lynching. Charley was an Okemah real-estate agent, district court clerk, Democratic politician, Freemason, and owner of the town's first automobile. According to Joe Klein, he was also a member of the Ku Klux Klan in the 1920s. There is no documentary evidence to support this; the allegation stems from his younger brother, Claude, whom Klein interviewed on tape in 1977 for his book Woody Guthrie: A Life (1980). Klein published that Charley had been part of the lynching mob, but without referring to the interview. Seth Archer found the tape in 2005 in the Woody Guthrie Archives in New York, and reported Claude's statement in the Southwest Review in 2006. During the interview, Claude Guthrie told Klein:

It was pretty bad back there in them days [...] The niggers was pretty bad over there in Boley, you know [...] Charley and them, they throwed this nigger and his mother in jail, both of them, the boy and the woman. And that night, why they stuck out and hung [laughter], they hung them niggers that killed that sheriff [...] I just kind of laughed [laughter]. I knew darn well that rascal [Charley] was—I knew he was in on it.

Woody Guthrie wrote two songs, unrecorded, about the Nelson's lynching, "Don't Kill My Baby and My Son" and "High Balladree". The songs refer to a woman and two sons hanging. His work was not always historically accurate; for example, he wrote elsewhere that he had witnessed some of the Nelsons' troubles, although he was born 14 months after their death. Guthrie recorded another song, "Slipknot", about lynching in Okemah in general. In one manuscript, he added at the end of the song: "Dedicated to the many negro mothers, fathers, and sons alike, that was lynched and hanged under the bridge of the Canadian River, seven miles south of Okemah, Okla., and to the day when such will be no more" (signed Woody G., February 29, 1940, New York). He also sketched a bridge in 1946 from which a row of lynched bodies hang; the sketch is held by the Ralph Rinzler archives in the Smithsonian.

See also

Ida B. Wells
"Strange Fruit" (1937) by Abel Meeropol
Tulsa race riot (1921)

Notes

References

Works cited

Contemporaneous articles

"A Deputy Sheriff Killed", The Independent (Okemah), May 4, 1911 (published weekly 1907–1914).
"Deputy Sheriff Loney Murdered", The Okemah Ledger, May 4, 1911 (published weekly 1907–1933).
"The Nelsons Have Examination", The Independent, May 11, 1911.
"Negro Female Prisoner Gets Unruly", The Okemah Ledger, May 18, 1911.
"Lynchers Avenge the Murder of Geo. Loney". The Okemah Ledger. May 25, 1911.
"Woman and boy lynched", The Independent, May 25, 1911.
"Woman Lynched by Side of Son", The Daily Oklahoman, May 26, 1911.

Further reading

The Crisis, back issues, 1910–1922.
Thirty Years of Lynching in the United States: 1889–1918. New York: The National Association for the Advancement of Colored People. April 1919.
Allen, James. "Musarium: Without Sanctuary" ("Without Sanctuary", a brief film about the collection).
"News from around the court house". The Okemah Ledger. May 11, 1911.
"Held for murder in first degree". The Okemah Ledger. May 11, 1911.
"Hang Negro Woman and Son". The New York Times. May 26, 1911.
"Mother and son lynched". Clinton Mirror. May 27, 1911.
"News from everywhere". The Dispatch. May 31, 1911.

1911 deaths
1911 in Oklahoma
1911 murders in the United States
American murder victims
Lynching deaths in Oklahoma
May 1911 events
Murdered African-American people
People murdered in Oklahoma
Racially motivated violence against African Americans
History of racism in Oklahoma